Lonigo is a town and comune in the province of Vicenza, Veneto, northern Italy, its population counts around 16,400 inhabitants.

In its frazione of Bagnolo is the Villa Pisani, a Renaissance patrician villa designed by Andrea Palladio, which is part of a World Heritage Site.  Another villa in the comune, Rocca Pisana, was designed by Vincenzo Scamozzi.

Outside the town is the church and complex of the 16th-century Sanctuary of Madonna dei Miracoli.

Transport
 Lonigo railway station

Twin towns
Lonigo is twinned with:
  Abensberg, Germany, since 1999

Sport
Lonigo is well known for motorcycle speedway and has a stadium known as the Santa Marina Stadium, which is a 5,000-capacity venue. Lonigo had previously had another speedway venue from 1947 to 1972.

Notable people
 

Mei Zhanchun (1864–1923), Franciscan Order Roman Catholic priest

See also
 Speedway Grand Prix of Italy

References

Cities and towns in Veneto